Brick Store may refer to any of the following, all of which are on the National Register of Historic Places (NRHP):

Sam Choy Brick Store, on the NRHP in California
Old Brick Store, on the NRHP in Delaware
Brick Store (Covington, Georgia), on the NRHP in Georgia
Red Brick Store, a contributing structure of the Nauvoo Historic District, Nauvoo, Illinois
Brick Store (Bath, New Hampshire), on the NRHP in New Hampshire
Brick Store Building, on the NRHP in New York
Hillsdale Brick Store, on the NRHP in North Carolina
Boon Brick Store, on the NRHP in Oregon
Also:

 Brick Store (Yarmouth, Maine), built in 1862